Yaska Nargiz Hajiyeva (born 12 April 1991) is an Azerbaijani women's football midfielder, who plays in the Turkish Women's Super League for Trabzonspor. She is a member of the Azerbaijan women's national team.

Club career 
Between 2014 and 2018, she played for Ugur FK (2014–2018) in her country. >She then went to Russia to play for Torpedo Izhevsk in the 2018–19 season.

In 2019, Hajiyeva moved to Turkey, and joined the Istanbul-based Turkish Women's First League club Fatih Vatan Spor on 1 November. After appearing in nine games of the 2019–20 Turkish Women's First League season, she returned home as the league was discontinued due to the COVID-19 pandemic in Turkey. 
In 2020, she was with Ryazan-VDV in the Russian Football Championship.

By Deceöber 2021, she went to Turkey again and signed with Hakkarigücü Spor to play in the Turkish Super League.

In the 2022–23 Turkish Super League season, she transferred to Trabzonspor. In the |2022–23 Turkish Super League season, she transferred to Trabzonspor.

International career 
Hajiyeva played for Azerbaijan women's national team in all four matches of the UEFA Women's Euro 2021 qualifying Group D.

Career statistics 
.

See also 
List of Azerbaijan women's international footballers

References

External links 
 

1991 births
Living people
Azerbaijani women's footballers
Azerbaijan women's international footballers
Women's association football midfielders
Azerbaijani expatriate footballers
Expatriate women's footballers in Russia
Azerbaijani expatriate sportspeople in Russia
Expatriate women's footballers in Turkey
Azerbaijani expatriate sportspeople in Turkey
Fatih Vatan Spor players
Ryazan-VDV players
Hakkarigücü Spor players
Turkish Women's Football Super League players
Trabzonspor women's players